Young Rising Stars Female Football Club, also referred as to Young Rising Stars F.F.C., is a Pakistani women's association football club based in Rawalpindi. Founded in 2007, the club has won the National Women Football Championship a record five times (2008, 2010, 2011, 2012, 2013). It has also won the U-16 National Youth Championship once (in 2014).

Young Rising Stars F.F.C. is not related to another Pakistani women's football club, Young Rising Stars Layyah, based in Layyah, which reached the group stage within the 2021 National Women Football Championship.

History 
The club was founded in 2007 by Ghias Uddin Baloch. The Embassy of the United States in Islamabad supported the club with training and coaching under its Youth Enrichment Summer Programme (YESP). The club also received support from Mari Gas Company and Rotary International.

The Young Rising Stars won the National Women Football Championship in 2008, just a year after its formation. The club got the third position in 2009. These performances led the players and the management to be invited to a two-week tour of the United States in April 2009 by the Youth Enrichment Program with the initiative of the US State Department. There, the players interacted with the coaches and teams of different educational institutes. However, Pakistan Football Federation (PFF) implemented a two-year ban on the club president, coach, and assistant coach for undertaking a foreign tour without obtaining a No Objection Certificate from the relevant authorities. The club was allowed to continue its operations under an interim set-up.

Young Rising Stars followed this up with success in the 2010 National Women Football Championship, winning four and drawing one match on their way to the title. The club also won the Fair Play, Top Scorer (Malika-e-Noor), and Best Goalkeeper (Syeda Mahpara) awards. Thus, the club became the first team to win the national title twice. Seven of its players (captain Sana Mahmud, Malika-e-Noor, Syeda Mahpara, Sahar Zaman, Asmara Kiani, Roshnan Ali, and Rozina Ghazi) were called up to the national team training camp for the 2010 SAFF Women's Championship. Club captain Sana Mehmood was soon named the new captain of the national team, with four of her teammates also joining the squad. In the opening match against Maldives, Malika-e-Noor scored the winner to enable Pakistan to win their first-ever football match.

The club was given permanent membership to the PFF Congress in December 2010.

The club was among the 24 teams to compete in the 2011 National Women Football Club Championship. The same year, it successfully defended its title in the 2011 National Women Football Championship held in Islamabad, beating Diya W.F.C. on penalties. YRS players Malika-e-Noor and Syeda Mahpara won the Top Scorer and Best Goalkeeper Awards, respectively.

In the 2012 edition of the National Championship, Young Rising Stars defended its yet again, beating WAPDA on penalty shoot-out.

The club won the inaugural edition of the National U-16 Inter-Club Women's Football Championship in 2014, beating Soccer Queen 4–0 in the final.

Honours 

 National Women Football Championship:
 Winners (5): 2008, 2010, 2011, 2012, 2013
 Third position (1): 2009
National U-16 Inter-Club Women's Football Championship
Winners (1): 2014

References

External links 

 Eleven Sports - Young Rising Stars F.F.C.'s matches - 2021 National Women Football Championship (video replay).
 Global Sports Archives - Young Rising Stars F.F.C.
 Global Sports Archives - Young Rising Stars F.F.C. U16

Women's football clubs in Pakistan
Association football clubs established in 2007
2007 establishments in Pakistan
Football in Rawalpindi
Young Rising Stars F.F.C.